Epeorus is a genus of mayflies in the family Heptageniidae.

Species

 Epeorus aculeatus Braasch, 1990
 Epeorus aesculus Imanishi, 1934
 Epeorus albertae (McDunnough, 1924)
 Epeorus alexandri (Kluge & Tiunova, 1989)
 Epeorus alpestris (Braasch, 1979)
 Epeorus alpicola (Eaton, 1871)
 Epeorus assimilis (Eaton, 1865)
 Epeorus bifurcatus Braasch & Soldán, 1979
 Epeorus bispinosus Braasch, 1980
 Epeorus boonsoongi Braasch, 2011
 Epeorus borneonia (Ulmer, 1939)
 Epeorus carninatus Braasch & Soldán, 1984
 Epeorus caucasicus (Tshernova, 1938)
 Epeorus cumulus Imanishi, 1939
 Epeorus curvatulus Matsumura, 1931
 Epeorus deceptivus (McDunnough, 1924)
 Epeorus dispar (Traver, 1933)
 Epeorus dulciana (McDunnough, 1935)
 Epeorus ermolenkoi Tschernova, 1981
 Epeorus extraordinarius Chen, Wang & Zhou, 2010
 Epeorus fragilis (Morgan, 1911)
 Epeorus frisoni (Burks, 1946)
 Epeorus frolenkoi Sinitshenkova, 1981
 Epeorus gilliesi Braasch, 1981
 Epeorus gornostajevi Tshernova, 1981
 Epeorus grandis (McDunnough, 1924)
 Epeorus gultsha (Kustareva, 1984)
 Epeorus gurvitshi (Kustareva, 1984)
 Epeorus guttatus (Braasch and Soldán, 1979)
 Epeorus hesperus (Banks, 1924)
 Epeorus hiemalis Imanishi, 1934
 Epeorus hieroglyphicus Braasch & Soldán, 1984
 Epeorus ikanonis Takahashi, 1924
 Epeorus inaequalis (Braasch & Soldán, 1980)
 Epeorus insularis (Braasch, 1983)
 Epeorus inthanonensis Braasch & Boonsoong, 2010
 Epeorus jacobi (Braasch, 1978)
 Epeorus kapurkripalanorum (Braasch, 1983)
 Epeorus khayengensis Boonsoong & Braasch, 2010
 Epeorus kirgisicus (Kustareva, 1984)
 Epeorus l-nigrus Matsumura, 1931
 Epeorus lagunitas (Traver, 1935)
 Epeorus lahaulensis Kapur & Kripalani, 1963
 Epeorus latifolium (Uéno, 1928)
 Epeorus longimaculatus (Braasch, 1980)
 Epeorus longimanus Eaton, 1885
 Epeorus longitibius (Nguyen & Baye, 2004)
 Epeorus maculatus (Tschernova, 1949)
 Epeorus magnus (Braasch, 1978)
 Epeorus margarita Edmunds and Allen, 1964
 Epeorus martensi (Braasch, 1981)
 Epeorus martinus (Braasch & Soldán, 1984)
 Epeorus metlacensis Traver, 1964
 Epeorus montanus (Brodsky, 1930)
 Epeorus namatus (Burks, 1946)
 Epeorus napaeus Imanishi, 1934
 Epeorus ngi Gui, Zhou and Su, 1999
 Epeorus nguyenbaeorum Braasch & Boonsoong, 2010
 Epeorus nguyeni Webb & McCafferty, 2007
 Epeorus nigripilosus (Sinitshenkova, 1976)
 Epeorus ninae Kluge, 1995
 Epeorus nipponicus (Uéno, 1931)
 Epeorus packeri Allen & Cohen, 1977
 Epeorus pamirensis (Kustareva, 1984)
 Epeorus papillatus (Braasch, 2006)
 Epeorus paraguttatus (Braasch, 1983)
 Epeorus pellucidus (Brodsky, 1930)
 Epeorus permagnus (Traver, 1935)
 Epeorus pleuralis (Banks, 1910)
 Epeorus psi Eaton, 1885
 Epeorus punctatus (McDunnough, 1925)
 Epeorus rheophilus (Brodsky, 1930)
 Epeorus rhithralis Braasch, 1980
 Epeorus rubeus Tiunova, 1991
 Epeorus sagittatus Tong & Dudgeon, 2003
 Epeorus sinespinosus (Braasch, 1978)
 Epeorus sinitshenkovae (Braasch & Zimmermann, 1979)
 Epeorus siveci (Braasch, 1980)
 Epeorus soldani (Braasch, 1979)
 Epeorus subpallidus (Traver, 1937)
 Epeorus suffusus (McDunnough, 1925)
 Epeorus suspicatus (Braasch, 2006)
 Epeorus sylvicola (Pictet, 1865)
 Epeorus thailandensis Boonsoong & Braasch, 2013
 Epeorus tianshanicus (Kustareva, 1984)
 Epeorus tiberius Braasch & Soldán, 1984
 Epeorus torrentium Eaton, 1881
 Epeorus uenoi (Matsumura, 1933)
 Epeorus unicornutus Braasch, 2006
 Epeorus unispinosus Braasch, 1980
 Epeorus vitreus (Walker, 1853)
 Epeorus yougoslavicus (Samal, 1935)
 Epeorus zaitsevi Tshernova, 1981
 Epeorus znojkoi (Tshernova, 1938)

References

Encyclopedia of Life entry

Mayflies
Mayfly genera
Arthropods of Asia